Gareth Edmund Malone   (born 9 November 1975) is an English choirmaster and broadcaster, self-described as an "animateur, presenter and populariser of choral singing". He is best known for his television appearances in programmes such as The Choir, which focus on singing and introducing choral music to new participants. Malone was appointed Officer of the Order of the British Empire (OBE) in the 2012 Birthday Honours, for services to music.

Biography
Gareth Malone was born into a family of Irish descent as the only child of James and Sian Malone, who had met at their local Gilbert and Sullivan society. His father, James Malone, grew up in Parkhead in Scotland in an Irish family, and was a bank manager. His English mother of Irish descent, Sian, worked in the civil service. Gareth was educated at Bournemouth School. He sang with the Symphony Chorus of the Bournemouth Symphony Orchestra (BSO) and he studied drama at the University of East Anglia, Norwich, where he was in the university choir and composed music for theatre productions. After graduating he gave private tuition and then applied for a postgraduate vocal studies course at the Royal Academy of Music; he passed with distinction in 2005.

Until December 2009, Malone worked for the London Symphony Orchestra at LSO St Luke's where he ran their youth choir and community choir. Whilst working at the L.S.O., Malone was awarded the position of Edward Heath Assistant Animateur in 2001. He entered television work when approached by 20/20, a production company which wanted to make a series about singing in schools. Without knowing who could front the programme they had researched the term  "community choirmasters" and discovered Malone's name. The Choir was the result and won two BAFTAs and a Broadcast award.

On 31 December 2009, Malone conducted the first New Year's Eve Twitter Community Choir performance of Auld Lang Syne. He asked his followers on Twitter, and friends on Facebook, to join in with the event.

A later project was The Knight Crew, a youth opera based on a book written by Nicky Singer and performed at Glyndebourne. After choosing approximately 50 cast out of over 400 applicants between the ages of 14–20 through workshops and auditions, and months of rehearsals, The Knight Crew was performed at Glyndebourne between 3 and 6 March 2010. The project was filmed for a television series, Gareth Malone Goes to Glyndebourne and aired on the BBC on 1 July 2010.

In May 2010, Malone was awarded the Freedom of the City of London by Nick Anstee, Lord Mayor of the City of London (not to be confused with the Mayor of London) in recognition of his music education work in that city.

In 2013, Malone recruited 16 singers aged from 18–27 for his Gareth Malone Voices choir.  They recorded a CD album and gave concerts at 14 locations throughout Britain in 2014.

Television work
Gareth Malone's television appearances began in 2007 with his reality television series The Choir, broadcast on BBC Two. The series focused on teaching choral singing to teenagers with no such experience, the first programme being set in Northolt High School, a comprehensive school in the west London suburbs. Subsequent programmes continued the theme by taking choral music to challenging situations: Boys Don't Sing (2008) featured pupils at Lancaster School, Leicester, an all-boys school where there was reluctance to sing; the third series, entitled Unsung Town, featured the formation of a community choir in South Oxhey, a suburban town where singing was not a common activity.

In 2010 Malone presented a children's programme for CBBC, The Big Performance in which ten keen, but extremely shy, young singers took the opportunity to overcome their fears. They sang for a larger audience each week, taking it in turns to be the soloist, and in the final week they performed for BBC Proms in the Park. A second series was broadcast in 2011 with the final week taking the form of a performance of a choral arrangement of the song "Keep Holding On" for the BBC charity telethon Children in Need 2011. The ten singers led a live choir in the studio along with children's choirs nationwide, linked by satellite.

For the BBC Two programme The Choir: Military Wives, first broadcast in November 2011, Malone went to Chivenor Barracks in Devon, creating a choir from wives and partners of military personnel deployed to Afghanistan. The culmination of the programme was the opening performance for the Royal British Legion's Festival of Remembrance at the Royal Albert Hall on 12 November 2011. The three-minute piece performed by the Military Wives Choir was the song Wherever You Are, a love poem compiled from letters written between the women and their absent husbands and partners and set to music by composer Paul Mealor.

A successful campaign was launched to promote sales of the CD single, with the aim of it becoming the 2011 Christmas number one in the UK Singles Chart, which was supported by BBC Radio 2 DJ Chris Evans. First day sales, which included all pre-orders, indicated that they were outselling their closest rivals, Little Mix, by a hundred singles to one, causing Ladbrokes to close betting for the Christmas number one, and Simon Cowell to admit defeat in the race. The pre-order sales caused the single to become one of the top 20 best-selling music products of all-time at Amazon.co.uk.

In 2011, Malone's show Gareth Malone Goes to Glyndebourne won an International Emmy Award in the Best Arts Programme category.

On 16 November 2014, it was announced that Malone and a group of celebrities he had mentored had reached the UK number 1 with their Children in Need charity single "Wake Me Up", a cover of the song originally recorded by Swedish dance act Avicii.

On 10 September 2015, Malone appeared on the BBC One programme Who Do You Think You Are?

In 2017, Malone presented Pitch Battle on BBC One, which The Guardian described as a "new Saturday teatime singing contest". The review continued: "His Pitch Battle entrance – following the sort of VT explainer that Celebrity Big Brother contestants tend to receive – was excruciating. As the crowd roared, he opened his jacket and showed off his shirt, like a professional wrestler would if he was doing double duty as an usher at his cousin’s wedding." The show was axed after one series, although Malone defended the series in a Radio Times interview, saying: "I thought it was good".

In March 2020, Malone announced an initiative titled the Great British Home Chorus, a new home choir for people internationally whilst everyone was stuck at home during the COVID-19 pandemic. He also revealed he had been in talks with the BBC about making another television programme. In the first week over 100,000 people viewed the first session on YouTube. In July 2020, as a finale to the Great British Home Chorus, Malone orchestrated a choral version of You Are My Sunshine with over 11,000 singers taking part, accompanied by the London Symphony Orchestra. The song was released as a single, with all the profits being donated to NHS Charities Together.

In August 2022, Malone appeared on Celebrity Masterchef. He was eliminated in the quarterfinals of the competition.

In September 2022, Malone appeared in series 2 of The Masked Dancer as Cactus.

Television filmography
Malone's television appearances include to date:

Bibliography 
Gareth Malone has written two books on the subject of choral singing. His most recent title, Choir: Gareth Malone, is an account of the production of his television series The Choir.

Personal life
Malone is married to Becky, an English teacher. They live in North London with their three children. Their eldest daughter, Esther, was born in 2010. Their son, Gilbert, was born in 2013.  They also have a younger daughter, Dvora, who was born in 2019.

References

External links

Gareth Malone - Desert Island Discs
Youtube video of Gareth conducting the Military Wives choir performing a Paul Mealor composition

1975 births
Living people
People educated at Bournemouth School
Alumni of the University of East Anglia
Musicians from Bournemouth
English male singers
English conductors (music)
British male conductors (music)
English television presenters
Alumni of the Royal College of Music
Emmy Award winners
Officers of the Order of the British Empire
English people of Irish descent
21st-century English singers
21st-century British conductors (music)
21st-century British male singers
Mass media people from Bournemouth